Li Chenden (1838 - 1864) was an eminent military general during the late Qing Dynasty in China. He joined the Xiang Army and fought effectively against the Taiping Rebellion, which restored stability of the Qing.

Porter, Jonathan. Tseng Kuo-Fan's Private Bureaucracy. Berkeley: University of California, 1972.
Wright, Mary Clabaugh. The Last Stand of Chinese Conservatism: The T'ung-Chih Restoration, 1862 -1874. Stanford, CA: Stanford University Press, 1957.
Third Battle of Nanking

External links
Suppressor of the Taiping Rebellion: Hakka Zeng Guofan
 Tang Haoming's Three-Book Trilogy of Zeng Guofan's life 《曾国荃》

1838 births
1864 deaths
People from Shaoyang
Qing dynasty generals
Generals from Hunan
Xiang Army personnel